Sonson may refer to:
 Sonsón, a Colombian municipality.
 SonSon, an arcade game by Capcom.
 Sonson (Capcom character), a fighting game character who is the granddaughter of the original Sonson from the above game.
 Sonson, a descendant of the sonson of Columbia who resides in St.Lucia b.k.a MyGweh.